James F. Post (September 24, 1818 – July 15, 1899) was an architect, builder, and contractor who designed and oversaw the construction of over 60 buildings. He is most known for his buildings in Wilmington, North Carolina, including the Bellamy Mansion, New Hanover County Courthouse, City Hall-Thalian Hall, and Zebulon Latimer House.

Early life 
James F. Post was born James Francis Post in Fairfield Township, Essex County, New Jersey, on September 24, 1818.

At some point around 1836, he moved to New York and studied architecture there for five years. In 1841 he moved to Petersburg, Virginia and worked as an architect and builder for eight years. During his time in Petersburg, he met his future wife Mary Ann Russel; they were married October 8, 1843. During their time in Virginia, the couple had two children: Erastus, who died shortly after, and Thomas Russell Post (1846-1943).

In 1849, the family moved to Wilmington, North Carolina, where they had a third child,  James France Post, Jr. (1850-1918). Post began his career in Wilmington by doing small carpentry jobs, but he soon took on larger jobs and developed a reputation as an architect. He took quickly to his newly adopted home and would later fight for North Carolina on the side of the Confederacy during the American Civil War.

Architecture career 
Little is known about Post’s architectural career before his move to Wilmington, however it is alleged he designed the first residence for millionaire John Jacob Astor in New York City 1840. Post moved to Wilmington, North Carolina in 1849 and resided there until his death in 1899.

Throughout his career, Post would identify with different careers in construction depending on the current demands of the community. In the 1850s he identified himself as a carpenter, while saying he was an architect by the 1860s. From the 1860s on, he would alternatively call himself any combination of the titles of architect, contractor, carpenter, and builder, often all four titles in succession. he would often engage in contractor work as a carpentry partner or as a supervising architect for local mason contractors like Joseph Keen or Robert B. and John C. Wood, usually when they undertook large projects.

In 1859 after finishing the City Hall-Thalian Hall project, Post undertook a commission to build the Bellamy Mansion for Dr. John D. Bellamy, one of the largest and most expensive homes built in Wilmington at the time. He assigned his assistant architect and draftsman, a fellow Northern architect named Rufus W. Bunnell whom Post had recruited from Connecticut in 1858, to create facade drawings and oversee construction. Bunnell stayed  until 1860, when he moved back North to escape the rising tensions leading to the Civil War.

After the war, Post   designed and/or superintended   many public buildings in Wilmington, including the Post Office (no longer standing) and the New Hanover County Courthouse. He also took on many private commissions, building homes, offices, and other buildings for residents of Wilmington and surrounding areas.

List of buildings 
According to his ledger records, James F. Post officially worked on over 60 projects, his entries detailing 66 different projects in the New Hanover Country area over the span of 53 years.

Military service 
The American Civil War began April 12, 1861, with North Carolina officially succeeding from the Union to join the Confederate States of America on May 20, 1861.

At the beginning of the war, James F. Post served in the North Carolina 2nd Artillery Regiment, also known as the 36th Regiment Volunteers or the “Cape Fear Regiment,” in 1st Company A, also known as “Wilmington Horse Artillery.” He rose to the rank of Second Lieutenant on June 18, 1861. He was not re-elected at the company’s reorganization on April 15, 1862 and was released from duty to civilian life on April 27, 1862.

Following his discharge, he continued to contribute to the Confederate war effort, employed by the Confederate government for building and repairing various military structures at installations such as Fort Fisher, Fort Anderson, and other locations that worked to protect to Wilmington’s harbor, which was not only a major Confederate port at the time but also one of the last ports still available to blockade runners until the fall of Fort Fisher in 1864.

Death 
Post died on July 15, 1899 at the age of 80. He was buried in Oakdale Cemetery, his wife Mary Ann later buried by his side when she died the following year in 1900.

References 



19th-century American architects
1818 births
1899 deaths
Architects from New Jersey
People from Fairfield Township, Essex County, New Jersey
Burials at Oakdale Cemetery